The Schweizer SA 1-30 was the first entry by Schweizer in the powered aircraft market.

Design and development
Schweizer developed a line of gliders starting in World War II. The 1-30 was not intended to be a motor glider, but rather a light aircraft utilizing some glider and sailplane technologies, common parts with other Schweizer designs and an affordable price as a result of using smaller powerplants. Removable wings, and the ability to be transported by trailer were also criteria for keeping airport-based hangar costs down.

The 1-30 shares the same wings and tail surfaces as the 1-26 glider. The fuselage is of aluminum construction with a welded steel tube tail structure. The wings are removable using the same design as the 1-26. The engine uses a cowling with exposed cylinders like a J-3 Cub for simplicity and cooling efficiency. Wing mounted spoilers were retained from the 1-26, allowing steep low-speed descents at about a 5:1 glide ratio. Three sets of wings were tested including a set from the model 2-31.

Operational history
Construction of the prototype was started in April 1958 and completed by August. The aircraft was tested as a glider aero-towing aircraft using a Schweizer SGU 2-22C. The single-place 1-30 was not intended to go into production, the two-place 2-31 was envisioned as the production model, but was also not produced beyond a single prototype.

Variants
SAU 1-30
The SA 1-30 modified with a  shorter wing and a fully cowled engine.

Specifications (Schweizer SA 1-30)

References

Homebuilt aircraft
Schweizer aircraft
Single-engined tractor aircraft
Aircraft first flown in 1958